Modzelewski (feminine: Modzelewska; plural: Modzelewscy) is a Polish surname. It may refer to:

 Dick Modzelewski (1931–2018), American football player and coach
 Ed Modzelewski (1929–2015), American football player
 Karol Modzelewski (1937–2019), Polish historian, writer and politician
 Mirosław Modzelewski (born 1970), Polish footballer
 Moira Modzelewski, American lawyer and US Navy captain
 Stanisław Modzelewski (1929–1969), Polish serial killer
 Zygmunt Modzelewski (1900–1954), Polish Communist politician
 Francine Clark née Modzelewska, French actress and art collector
 Stanley Stutz né Modzelewski (1920–1975), American basketball player

See also
 

Polish-language surnames